True Adolescents is a 2009 American comedy film written and directed by Craig Johnson and starring Mark Duplass, Bret Loehr and Carr Thompson.

It premiered at the 2009 South by Southwest Film Festival, where it was nominated for the narrative feature grand jury prize.

Plot summary
Sam (Mark Duplass) is a washed-up rocker in his mid-30s. Jobless and apartment-less, he crashes with his aunt (Melissa Leo) as a last resort and becomes reluctant camping-trip chaperone to her teenage son and a friend. On the trip, the three males turn out to be on par, maturity-wise. But in the Pacific Northwest wilderness a surprising discovery turns dire—and the distance from boy to man must be covered overnight.

Cast
 Mark Duplass as Sam
 Bret Loehr as Oliver
 Carr Thompson as Jake
 Melissa Leo as Sharon

References

External links
Official movie site

2009 films
2009 comedy films
2009 independent films
American comedy films
American independent films
Films shot in Washington (state)
Films set in Seattle
Films shot in Seattle
2009 directorial debut films
2000s English-language films
Films directed by Craig Johnson
2000s American films
English-language comedy films